Herbert Thomas Mundin (21 August 1898 – 5 March 1939) was an English character actor. He was frequently typecast in 1930s Hollywood films like The Adventures of Robin Hood as an older cheeky eccentric, a type helped by his jowled features and cheerful disposition.

Early life
Mundin was born in St Helens, then in Lancashire (now part of Merseyside). His father was a nomadic, Primitive Methodist home missionary. His family moved within a short time of his birth to St Albans in Hertfordshire (the 1901 census data reveal that the family lived at St Helens Villa, Paxton Road, St Albans; his parents William and Jane apparently naming their house after the town where they first met and where Herbert was born). Mundin was educated at St Albans School. During World War I he served with the Royal Navy.

Career
He began his acting career on the London stage during the 1920s. Mundin first travelled to America on 18 December 1923 for a series of theatrical engagements in New York. He sailed from Southampton on the RMS Aquitania and described himself in ship’s passenger manifest as 5'7" tall with a fair complexion, brown hair, blue eyes and a scar over his left eye. His big break as an actor was arguably with Gertrude Lawrence and Beatrice Lillie in Charlot's Revue when it appeared on Broadway in 1925.

In 1931, after working in Australia and London, he permanently moved to the United States, where he received a contract with the Fox Film Corporation, where he had a successful career as a character actor in over fifty films. Perhaps his most celebrated role was as Much, the miller's son in The Adventures of Robin Hood (1938) alongside Errol Flynn. Other film appearances included Mutiny on the Bounty (1935) with Charles Laughton and Clark Gable, and MGM's David Copperfield (1935) as Barkis.

Death
Mundin died at Van Nuys, Los Angeles, California in a car crash. He was killed instantly when the car which he was in collided with another car at a street intersection. The force of the impact threw open the door and threw him out of the vehicle onto the street, Mundin sustaining a fractured skull and crushed chest. He was 40 years old. The other occupants of the car were not injured. His body was buried at Inglewood Park Cemetery, Los Angeles, his gravestone has the initials 'R.N.' upon it, referencing his war service with the British Royal Navy.

Filmography

Film

Theatre

References

Bibliography

 Wearing, J. P. (2014). The London Stage 1920-1929: A Calendar of Productions, Performers and Personnel. Rowman and Littlefield
 Hischak, Thomas S. (2009). Broadway Plays and Musicals: Descriptions and Essential Facts of More Than 14,000 Shows through 2007. McFarland

External links 

 
 
 Herbert Mundin the Hollywood Scene Stealer  - Herbert Mundin Website
 

English male film actors
People from St Albans
People from St Helens, Merseyside
People educated at St Albans School, Hertfordshire
1898 births
1939 deaths
20th-century English male actors
20th Century Studios contract players
Male actors from Hertfordshire
English male stage actors
Road incident deaths in California
Burials at Inglewood Park Cemetery
British expatriate male actors in the United States
Vaudeville performers